Ogbia is a Local Government Area of Bayelsa State in the Niger Delta region of Nigeria.

It has an area of 695 km and a population of 179,926. It is well known for its historic value to the today Nigerian state economy mainstay, i.e., its oil industry, being the local government area encompassing Oloibiri the first place oil was discovered on Sunday 15 January 1956.

The postal code of the area is 562.
Ogbia is also the name of a subgroup of the Ijaw nation. The Ogbia people, speak the Ogbia language, a unique Ijaw dialect. The Ogbia people who inhabit the Ogbia local government of Bayelsa have close kinship and language ties with the Okoroma people of Nembe local government of Bayelsa; the Odual people of Abua/Odual local government of Rivers state as well as the Ogbogolo people of Ahoada-West in Rivers state. 
The present political headquarters of the Ogbia people, is Ogbia town; a town conceptualized and founded in 1972 by the Ogbia brotherhood. It also serves as the local government headquarters. 
The inhabitants of Ogbia land are mainly fishermen and farmers. Former Nigerian president Goodluck Ebele Jonathan was born in Otuoke, Ogbia. The first civilian governor of the old Rivers state, Chief Milford Obiene Okilo was also from Emakalakala in Ogbia. According Alagoa (2009)  King Amakiri, the first king of modern Kalabari kingdom (1669-1757) came from Emakalakala in Ogbia.

Ogbia Communities/Town'
Ogbia
Imiringi
Elebele
Kolo 1
Kolo 2
Kolo 3
Emeyal 1
Emeyal 2
Otuasega
Oruema
Emakalakala
Eboh
Obeduma
Akipelai
Otuagbagi
Otuoke
Otakeme
Oloibiri
 Abobiri
 Opume
 Otuogori
Idema
Otuokpoti
Anyama
Onuebum
Ewema
Otuabulla 1
Otuabulla 2
Ologi
Otuedu
Okodi
Ayakoro
Otuobhi

References

Local Government Areas in Bayelsa State
Ijaw states